The Forbidden Trail is a 1923 American silent Western film written and directed by Robert N. Bradbury and starring Jack Hoxie.

A print is preserved in the Library of Congress.

Cast
 Jack Hoxie - Jack Merriwell/Colonel Jim Merriwell
 Evelyn Nelson - Isobel
 Frank Rice - Toby Jones
 William Berke - Rufe Trent (* as Bill Lester)
 Joseph McDermott - Red Hawk Dugan (* as Joe McDermott)
 Thomas G. Lingham - John Anthony Todd (* Tom Lingham)
 Steve Clemente - Uncle Mose (* Steve Clemento)

References

External links
 The Forbidden Trail at IMDb.com
 
 the film on DVD

1923 films
1923 Western (genre) films
American black-and-white films
Films directed by Robert N. Bradbury
Silent American Western (genre) films
Surviving American silent films
1920s American films
1920s English-language films